Danylo Serhiyovych Kalenichenko (born 2 February 1994) is a Ukrainian tennis player.
Kalenichenko has a career high ATP singles ranking of World No. 439 achieved on 13 January 2020. He also has a career high ATP doubles ranking of World No. 378 achieved on 22 October 2018.

Kalenichenko has reached seven career singles finals, with a record of 4 wins and 3 losses. Additionally, he has reached 30 career doubles finals with a record of 18 wins and 12 losses. All 37 combined finals have come at the ITF Futures level.

Kalenichenko has represented Ukraine at the Davis Cup where he has a W/L record of 0–1.

In September 2022 the ITF anti-doping announced that Kalenichenko was provisionally suspended from 20 January 2022 from competition after testing positive for the banned anabolic steroid LGD-4033 and banned for a period of three and half years officially starting on 9 November 2021.

ATP Challenger and ITF Futures finals

Singles: 7 (4–3)

Doubles: 30 (18–12)

References

External links
 
 
 

1994 births
Living people
Ukrainian male tennis players
Sportspeople from Kyiv
Doping cases in tennis